The 42nd South American U20 Championships in Athletics were held in Leonora, Guyana, on 3 and 4 June. It was the first time that this competition was held in Guyana.

Medal summary

Men

Women

Medal table

References

External links
Event's Webpage

South American U20 Championships in Athletics
South American U20 Championships in Athletics
South American U20 Championships in Athletics
South American U20 Championships in Athletics